Daniel Rodrigo Lucenti (born May 10, 1978 in San Martín, Santa Fe) is an Argentine judoka, who competed in the men's lightweight category. He held a 2002 Argentine senior title for his own division, picked up a total of eight medals in his career, including two from the Pan American Judo Championships, and also competed with his brother Emmanuel Lucenti for the Argentine judo squad at the 2004 Summer Olympics.

Lucenti qualified for the Argentine squad in the men's lightweight class (73 kg) at the 2004 Summer Olympics in Athens, by placing third and receiving a berth from the Pan American Championships in Margarita Island, Venezuela. He lost his opening match to U.S. judoka and eventual bronze medalist Jimmy Pedro, who successfully scored an ippon and gripped him with a yoko shiho gatame (side four quarter) hold forty-five seconds before the clock expired.

References

External links

1978 births
Living people
Argentine male judoka
Olympic judoka of Argentina
Judoka at the 2004 Summer Olympics
People from San Martín Department, Santa Fe
South American Games silver medalists for Argentina
South American Games medalists in judo
Competitors at the 2002 South American Games
Sportspeople from Santa Fe Province
20th-century Argentine people
21st-century Argentine people